Events from the year 1766 in Canada.

Incumbents
Monarch: George III

Governors
Governor of the Province of Quebec: James Murray
Governor of Nova Scotia: Montague Wilmot
Commodore-Governor of Newfoundland: Hugh Palliser

Events
 March 18 – The Stamp Act is repealed.

Births

Deaths

Historical documents
Secretary of State Conway suggests Gov. Murray be recalled from Quebec immediately, and George III concurs, referring to "many heavy charges" against him

Two ministers support judicial reforms for Quebec, including superior court with  French-speaking justices, and tolerance of local customs

"Two nations are to be kept in peace and harmony" - New Quebec attorney general argues for Catholics and law-making power of governor-in-council

There being no Quebec assembly and no more French wine imports, Parliament should set province's taxes on British liquor to restore its revenue

Given huge French-English population imbalance, establishing popular assembly in Quebec should be delayed until "expedient and proper"

"Freed from the Impositions of the grievous Stamp" - Repeal of Stamp Act ends "desolation," "misery" and "heavy loss" to Quebec commerce

Any Quebec subject may sit on jury, cases between Canadian subjects must have juries of Canadians only, and Canadians may act as barristers

After saying products of Quebec's economy do not pay for half of necessities imported, writer insists Britain "pay the internal Charges of the Colony"

£50 reward offered for names of anyone committing violence against Indigenous people in lands reserved for them under Royal Proclamation of 1763

Notice that Protestant teacher of languages (Latin, Greek, Italian, French, Spanish, Low Dutch) seeks scholars and adult learners in Quebec City

Missing Black woman, age 24 ("pitted with the Small-pox, speaks good English"), is sought through Quebec newspaper ad

"To Be Sold, An indented Servant woman, who has Three Years and Eight Months to serve."

King awards "Royal" title to regiment bound for Quebec, but officer says 1 penny more per day in pay would be "much more essential Compliment"

Garden seeds for sale, including "Pease and Beans,[...]Spinnage,[...]early Dutch Turnips, [and] Some Excellent Roots of Ranunculus"

Any prospective Nova Scotia grammar school teacher to be vetted by local minister (or JPs) and five townsmen; no Catholics to be allowed

Nova Scotia law prohibits sale within 10 miles of any public market of anything on sale there, or reselling any market's grain, hay or animal goods

Employing and supplying thousands who work in Newfoundland, Cape Breton and St. John's Island fisheries both enrich and empower Britain

Michilimackinac welcomes Robert Rogers as "Indian Nations, almost worn out with repeated Solicitations for Traders, are on the Eve of Discontent"

References 

 
Canada
66